The  is a system that allows players to be held for the purpose of training players separately from the 70 registered players under control of each team created in the fall of  at Nippon Professional Baseball (NPB).

Summary 
This system was established in 2005 to create an environment in which amateur players can newly play in the situation where company-owned amateur baseball teams were being abolished one after another. A  is a player who aims to improve baseball skill training and manner training in order to aim for registered players under control, that is eligible to participate in NPB's first league official game (Central League, Pacific League, Interleague play (NPB)). (Regulations for NPB Developmental players, Article 2) 

A developmental players include players drafted as rookies (e.g. There is an argument that eliminating players who cannot play due to injury from the registration of players under control and re-signing them as developmental players will protect their careers. On the other hand, the use of the developmental players system instead of the Major League Baseball (MLB) Injured list system is criticized as contrary to the original principle of this system, which is to open the door to amateur players and develop them. The longest period as a developmental player was 's eight seasons (2011-) as of the  season.

Regulations for Developmental Player
Player Rules
 Basically, they are not allowed to participate in official NPB games. However, up to five players per team per game are allowed to play in the Eastern League and Western League for developmental players. Other players play in practice games for the second squad. And make up the third squad, like the Yomiuri Giants and the Fukuoka SoftBank Hawks, and play in games against independent league teams such as the Shikoku Island League Plus and Baseball Challenge League, corporate amateur teams, and university teams. The Hawks’ｓ third squad play more than 100 games a year. But there is a difference in contract between a registered players under control and a developmental players, but unlike the relationship between major leaguers and minor leaguers in Major League Baseball, they are players on the same team. They use the same practice facility and player dormitory.
 The contract is for a maximum of three years, but after the fourth year, the player can become a free agent once and sign with the same team again. After the fourth season, the contract will be for one year, and after each season, the NPB will announce the free agent status, after which the player can re-sign. This measure is intended to increase the player's chances of signing a registration of players under control contract, and during the free agent period, he can negotiate with other teams. In 2019, Hiroki Hasegawa moved from the Fukuoka Softbank Hawks to the Tokyo Yakult Swallows. A one-year contract is also possible for a registered players under control to re-sign as a developmental player after a free agent announcement has been made. (Regulations for NPB Developmental players, Article 10) Players who have not been under contract for three seasons will be placed on the roster of pending developmental players, and other teams will not be able to negotiate with them.
 The minimum salary is 2.4 million yen and 3 million yen is paid as a preparation fee when drafted. However, since there is no cap on annual salary, some teams sign players at higher salaries, and players who are re-signed as developmental players from a registered players under control often maintain the salary level of a registered players under control. The number on the back of the uniform of the developmental players will be a three-digit number (e.g. 110, or 001).

Regulations for teams that own developmental players
 The deadline for re-signing a developmental player as a registered players under control is from the end of the season to July 31st during the following season, as stated above.However, it is not permitted to change from a registered players under control to a developmental contract during the season.
 A developmental players can only be owned by teams with at least 65 controlled players as of July 31, and teams with fewer than 65 controlled players cannot own them. However, if a team reports to the Executive Committee that it has re-signed a developmental player as a controlled player or acquired a new controlled player to bring the number of controlled players to 65 or more, and if this is approved, the team may retain the developmental player. (Regulations for NPB Developmental players, Article 3) There is no limit to the number of developmental players owned. Some teams, such as the Yomiuri Giants and Fukuoka Softbank Hawks, have more than 30 players and use a 3-team system, while others, such as the Hanshin Tigers, have only a few players, depending on the team's policy. The Fukuoka SoftBank Hawks have selected 14 new developmental players in the 2022 draft to implement a four-team system from the 2023 season. 

Developmental Players Draft Meeting
 If the total number of players selected at the end of the Rookie Player Selection Conference has not reached 120, a Developmental Players Selection  Meeting will be held with the participation of the teams that wish to participate.

Developmental players trade
 Article 11 of the Nippon Professional Baseball Developed Player Regulations states that a trade of a developmental player held by July 31 is allowed, but as of the 2022 season, there are no examples of such a trade.

Outcome

The developmental player system, which began in the 2005 season, has been successful in producing major players for each team. (e.g. Yoshiki Sunada, Yuji Nishino) The Yomiuri Giants, who have been working on this system since early on, have signed more than 50 developmental players as their registered players under control as of the 2022 season. The Fukuoka Softbank Hawks have also signed 40 developmental players as their registered players under control, and have produced players like Kodai Senga and Takuya Kai who have won league titles and awards and represented Japanese baseball on the national baseball team. The Hokkaido Nippon-Ham Fighters, which had been reluctant to acquire developmental players, drafted a player as a developmental player for the first time in the 2018 draft. In the 2022 draft, 51 players will be selected as developmental players, the largest number in history, and the acquisition of developmental players is a growing trend.

Current developmental player rosters

Central League 
Current Central League Developmental players rosters 

Chunichi Dragons

Pitchers
 201 Ryushin Takeuchi
 202 Frank Álvarez
 204 Tatsuro Hamada
 206 Yuta Matsukihira
 207 Hiroaki Matsuda 
 208 Shō Ishikawa
 209 Shōta Fukushima
 211 Yūta Ōmine

Hanshin Tigers

Pitchers
 124 Atsushi Mochizuki
 125 Ryo Itoh
 126 Johichiro Maki
 127 Riku Kawahara

Hiroshima Toyo Carp

Pitchers
 120  Shun Namiki
 122  Rei Sakata
 125  Takaya Toda
 126  Soh Shinya
 128  Raisei Nakamura
Infielders
 121  Shoichi Futamata
 127  Seita Maekawa
Outfielders
 124  Motohide Kinoshita

Tokyo Yakult Swallows

Pitchers
 017  Shota Maruyama
 019  Shinnosuke Shimo
Catchers
 022  Sho Matsui
 025  Taishi Uchiyama
Outfielders
 024  Yukihiro Iwata

Yokohama DeNA BayStars

Pitchers
 102  Dai Kato
 107  Hansel Marcelino
 109  Yofrec Diaz
 110  Starlin Cordero
Catchers
 104  Naoya Higashide
Outfielders
 028  Atsushi Katsumata
 103  Nagi Murakawa
 105  Takeru Ohashi

Yomiuri Giants

Pitchers
 002 Daniel Missaki
 011 Naoki Kasashima
 014 Makoto Kyomoto
 015 Haruto Kawasaki
 016 Ryusei Takata
 017 Riku Naraki
 018 Motoya Kinoshita
 028 Ryu Tomida
 030 Yusuke Yamasaki
 040 Tappei Tanioka
 046 Hirotaka Yonahara
 047 Eiji Kamouchi
 051 Kenyu Abe
 056 Yusuke Itoh
 059 Toyoki Tanaka
 068 Yu Suzuki
 092 Shohei Numata
 095 Hayato Horioka
Catchers
 006 Hayato Sakamoto
 010 Ryoya Ohtsu
 022 Keita Kameda
 024 Kenki Maeda
Infielders
 001 Ren Katoh
 007 Jose De La Cruz
 021 Hibiki Kuroda
 025 Hiroto Okamoto
 093 Hayato Hirama
 098 Estamy Urena
Outfielders
 003 Yamato Suzuki
 009 Misaki Sasahara
 013 Julian Tima
 055 Koichi Hoshina
 097 Kaito Itoh

Pacific League 
Current Pacific League Developmental players rosters 

Chiba Lotte Marines

Pitchers
 120 Fuuki Tanaka
 125 Kirato Nagashimada
Catchers
 122 Yuito Tanigawa
 126 Ryosuke Murayama
Infielders
 123 Shota Hayamizu
Outfielders
 130 Sandy Santos
 131 Jorge Peralta

Fukuoka SoftBank Hawks

Pitchers
 120  Hiroki Sato
 123  Yuya Nakamichi
 124  Shuji Kuwahara
 133  Naoya Okamoto
 134  Shinno Ohshiro
 135  Alexander Armenta
 138  Tomoaki Shigeta
 139  Sanshiro Izaki
 140  Mizuki Miura
 141  Mailon Felix
 143  Shun Murakami
 145  Leiri Hammond Tanaka
 147  Koki Katoh
 148  Takuma Yamasaki
 152  Masaki Takimoto
 154  Takuma Sato
 156  Luis Rodríguez
 172  Yuki Watanabe
Catchers
 121  Soichiro Ishizuka
 129  Shoma Itani
 151  Sora Katoh
Infielders
 122  Keio Fujino
 127  Riku Ogata
 128  Daisuke Itoh
 130  Haruki Katsuren
 136  Shota Araki
 146  Frankelly Geraldino
 149  Takuto Sakuma
 153  Yoshiki Mishiro
Outfielders
 125  Shinnosuke Haya
 131  Hidetora Funakoshi
 132  Yuto Kawamura
 142  Takamasa Nakamura
 144  Maruko Shimon
 150  Keita Yamamoto
 155  Keisuke Nakata

Hokkaido Nippon-Ham Fighters

Pitchers
 113 Ryota Hasegawa
 114 Ryodai Matsumoto
 115 Shinji Saitoh
 121 Ren Fukushima
 123 Taisei Yanagawa
 148 Yuki Takayama
 161 Yuya Himeno
Catchers
 122 Takanari Hayamizu
Infielders
 112 Ryunosuke Higuchi
 155 Yuhei Nanba
Outfielders
 124 Kazuhiro Abe

Orix Buffaloes

Pitchers
 001 Kazuma Satoh
 002 Futa Tanioka
 003 Yuito Nakata
 008 Masayuki Matsuyama
 011 Kento Kawase
 012 Takara Tsujigaki
 125 Tsubasa Sakakibara
Catchers
 005 Ryoya Tsurumi
 014 Jui Tsuri
Infielders
 021  Keita Sonobe
 022  Kosei Ohsato
 120  Shinya Hirosawa
Outfielders
 004 Yamato Hirano

Saitama Seibu Lions

 111 Hiromasa Saito
 112 Kaito Awatsu
 113 Sho Itoh
 114 Towa Uema
 116 Jasier Herrera
 120 Toshihiro Idei
 124 Taishi Mameda
 128 Shinya Sugai
Catchers
 101  Hitoto Komazuki
 125  Takeru Furuichi
Outfielders
 115  Romer Cuadrado
 123  Joseph Ken Miyamoto
 129  Keishin Kawamura

Tohoku Rakuten Golden Eagles

Pitchers
 001 Tomoki Sato
 004 Shuichiro Hikiji
 007 Yoma Fukumori
 016 Yudai Mori 
 017 Wang Yan-cheng
 135 Kotaro Seimiya
 152 Shun Ishida
Catchers
 137 Yuto Egawa
Infielders
 140 Maaki Yamazaki
 141 Kiyoharu Sawano
Outfielders
 122 Go Kamamoto
 142 Ozora Yanagisawa
 144 Sho Okawara

See also
 Nippon Professional Baseball
 List of current Nippon Professional Baseball team rosters
 Registration of players under control

References

External links
 Nippon Professional Baseball Agreement・Unified contract documents - Japan Professional Baseball Players Association Official site 
 Nippon Professional Baseball public notice 2022 - NPB.jp 
 Teams index - NPB.jp

Nippon Professional Baseball
Nippon Professional Baseball players
Baseball in Japan
2005 establishments in Japan